This is a list of defunct airlines of Nepal.

See also
 List of airlines of Nepal
 List of airports in Nepal

Notes

References

Nepal
Airlines
Airlines, defunct